N1-Methyl-lysergic acid diethylamide (MLD-41) is a derivative of LSD that has about one-third the psychoactive effects. It has been studied in cross-tolerance of LSD.

Metabolism of other 1-methylated-ergoloids to their secondary amine derivatives has been frequently noted in mammals.

References

Lysergamides